Showa: A History of Japan, known in Japan as , is a Japanese manga series written and illustrated by Shigeru Mizuki. An autobiographical work, this manga describes the author's experiences growing up during the Shōwa period. The author is a veteran of the Japanese army, but his series is filled with critical views of Japanese and American militarism.

Release
The manga was republished as Comic Showa-shi by Kodansha from August 1, to November 4, 1994, and a box with all the eight volumes was released on December 14, 1994. An adaptation titled  was written by Kōji Kata and published on August 19, 2004 by Iwanami Shoten.

In February 2013, Drawn & Quarterly announced it would publish the manga under the title Showa: A History of Japan. The company released Showa 1926-1939 in October 2013, Showa 1939-1944 in May 2014, Showa 1944-1953 in November 2014, and Showa 1953-1989 in September 2015.

Reception
It received the 1989 Kodansha Manga Award for the general category. In 2014 and 2016, respectively, the first edition and the fourth edition of Showa published by Drawn & Quarterly were nominated by the Harvey Awards in the category "Best American Edition of Foreign Material". It was also nominated at the Eisner Award in the category "Best U.S. Edition of International Material—Asia" in 2014 for Showa 1926-1939, and it won it in 2015 and 2016 for Showa 1939-1944 and Showa 1953-1989 respectively.

Comics critic Paul Gravett elected Showa: A History of Japan the third best manga published in North America in 2014, asking "What a better way to tell an epic modern history lesson than in these multi-layered, accessible manga?"

References

External links

Drawn & Quarterly titles
Historical anime and manga
Kodansha manga
Seinen manga
Shigeru Mizuki
Winner of Kodansha Manga Award (General)
Autobiographical anime and manga